is a Japanese visual artist from Tokyo. She went viral for her artworks that displayed support for former mayor of Davao City and now Philippine President Rodrigo Duterte during the election period. In October 2016, Duterte gave Endo a courtesy call at Malacañang Palace together with some Japanese investors based in the Philippines.

References

External links 
 

Living people
Japanese portrait painters
Japanese expatriates in the Philippines
Artists from Tokyo
21st-century Japanese painters
21st-century Japanese women artists
Year of birth missing (living people)